Mauritz Brännström (January 4, 1918 – February 8, 2006) was a Swedish cross-country skier who competed in the late 1930s through the 1950s.

Skiing career
Brännström won the Vasaloppet event in 1941.

Brännström also finished second in the 50 km at the 1941 FIS Nordic World Ski Championships, which had taken place in  Cortina d'Ampezzo, Italy. The event was later declared a "non-event" by the International Ski Federation (FIS) in 1946 due to the small number of skiers who had competed. Due to this decision, the medals were not counted in the overall FIS Nordic World Ski Championships.

In 1957, he won the Malmfältsloppet Race.

Cross-country skiing results

World Championships

References

External links
Hickok Sports results on FIS Nordic World Ski Championships
Sports123 information on Vasaloppet winners
Vasaloppet winners of the 1940s 

1918 births
2006 deaths
Swedish male cross-country skiers
Vasaloppet winners